Tai Seng Facility Building, abbreviated as TSFB or Tai Seng, is an underground train depot for the Mass Rapid Transit system in Singapore. The depot is constructed towards the east of Kim Chuan Depot and will provide maintenance, stabling and operational facilities for the Downtown line. It is located in Hougang along Bartley Road East. It is accessible via a surface building located along Bartley Road East.

The depot is approximately 52 metres wide, 295 metres long and 20 metres deep. It is connected to Kim Chuan Depot and has underground access for trains to run between both facilities, allowing Downtown line trains to be stabled in the Tai Seng Facility Building, and able to access its remote tracks. It is used in tandem with Kim Chuan Depot for the operations of the Downtown line.

History
Construction of the Tai Seng Facility Building began in November 2010 and was targeted for completion in March 2013, ahead of the commencement of service along the Downtown line Stage 1. The rolling stock for the line were stabled at the neighbouring Kim Chuan Depot, which houses the trains for the Circle line.

When Stage 1 of the Downtown line opened on 22 December 2013, Kim Chuan Depot was used for maintenance and launching of rolling stock for the Downtown line, until Stage 2 was completed on 27 December 2015, providing access to Gali Batu Depot, the Downtown line's main depot. During that time, Downtown line trains had to be towed from the facility via Circle line tracks overnight to Stage 1 of the Downtown line for revenue service and light maintenance work was done at the temporary Marina Bay Maintenance Facility.

The depot is used at full capacity for the housing and maintenance of trains. This will also include a direct connection between the line directly to the facility between Ubi station and Bedok North station via two reception tracks: 1 track Bukit Panjang-bound towards Ubi station and 1 track Expo-bound towards Bedok North station.

References 

2017 establishments in Singapore
Mass Rapid Transit (Singapore) depots
Tampines